Dilmah is a Sri Lankan brand of Ceylon tea, sold internationally. The company was founded in 1988 by Merrill J Fernando. The name Dilmah was chosen by combining the first names of Fernando's sons Dilhan and Malik. It is available in over 100 countries, including Estonia, the United Kingdom, Turkey, Lithuania, Malaysia, Singapore, Pakistan, Poland, Russia, Hungary, Canada, Chile, Argentina, Portugal, South Africa, Australia, India, Indonesia, Japan, the United States, Saudi Arabia, Switzerland, Taiwan and New Zealand. In 2009 it was considered that Dilmah was the sixth-largest tea brand in the world.

History
The Company's founder, Merrill J. Fernando, was born in 1930 in the village of Pallansena, near Negombo. He moved to Colombo, where he became one of the Ceylonese tea tasters, training at Mincing Lane, London.

In 1974 Fernando bought his first few tea estates to try his hand at producing Sri Lankan tea, and in 1981 he founded Ceylon Tea Services Limited.

In 1985, Merril Fernando convinced the Australian supermarket retailer Coles to stock his brand of tea, Dilmah. He spoke to a Coles buyer about stocking his tea and eventually won him over. In 1988 a Melbourne Coles store started stocking Dilmah on its shelves. It eventually spread to 35 other Coles stores in Victoria and then Woolworths started selling the product as well. Dilmah later exported the tea to New Zealand,  where it was the top-selling brand in 2013, and also to Europe and North America. In 2013, Australia made up 10 percent of Dilmah's global annual retail sales.

In September 2009 Ceylon Tea Services, Dilmah's parent company, earned US$5.2 million on US$19.7 million in revenue, which was up from profits of US$1.3 million, on US$18.6 million in revenue the year before.

In 2007, Dilmah Conservation was founded, "to incorporate environmental and wildlife conservation efforts into the work of the MJF Charitable Foundation, which primarily focuses on social justice".

References

External links
 Official International Dilmah site

Tea brands
Sri Lankan tea
Sri Lankan brands
Tea companies of Sri Lanka
Companies listed on the Colombo Stock Exchange